MinNature Malaysia (previously known as MinNature) is a miniature gallery which focuses on Malaysia's culture and heritage. The gallery houses thousands of miniature sculptures crafted mostly by hand and, the buildings and structures are 3D designed and 3D printed. The gallery is currently situated inside Sungei Wang Plaza, Kuala Lumpur and is over 13,000 sq ft and is divided into 8 different zones.

History 
The founder, Wan Cheng Huat, first thought of this concept idea to have a miniature world way back in 2008. It was inspired by the world's largest miniature train exhibition, Miniatur Wunderland in Hamburg, Germany. Wan and co-founder, Nicholas Ong, took over 5 years to fund raise the first gallery which was built in Summit USJ, Selangor back in 2014. 

The 3D design and 3D print works started in June 2014 and it took over 2 years to completely fabricate all of the models for the first phase. The in situ construction and assembly started mid-March 2016 and was completed in November 2016. Over 88 people were involved with the first gallery construction. The gallery in Summit USJ operated from 2016 till 2019.

Works for the 2nd gallery at Sungei Wang Plaza started back in October 2018 and started renovation works in July 2019. Over 40 people were involved with the 2nd gallery but 99% of the works done were completed by (6+1) of the core team; they are

 Wan Cheng Huat
 Janice Chin
 Chan Chee Wing
 Tan Hon Sen
 Ng Jef Fre
 Brian Tan
 Eric Siow

The first phase of the 2nd gallery opened to public on 29th February 2020 and was mostly closed since 18th March 2020 due to the COVID19 lockdowns.

Craft meets Technology 
The MinNature Masterbuilders uses a mixture of traditional craftmanship and technology to create all their miniature pieces.

References

External links 
MinNature website: http://minnature.com

2014 establishments in Malaysia
Transport in Malaysia